Santosh Kumar Gangwar (born 1 November 1948) is an Indian politician and the former Minister of State with independent charge in the Ministry of Labour and Employment in the Government of India. He is a Member of Parliament (16th Lok Sabha), former minister of state in Government of India and a leader of Bharatiya Janata Party (BJP). He has been Member of Parliament for the city of Bareilly since 1989 till date (except 2009–2014). He was also the chief whip of the party in 14th Lok Sabha. He faced defeat in the 15th Lok Sabha Elections, 2009 by a very narrow margin. Gangwar was the chairman of the PAC Public Accounts Committee (India) in 2009. He has been elected as Member of Parliament in 16th Lok Sabha. He won by a margin of over 2.4 lakh votes over his rival candidate in 2014 general election. He resigned from the post of cabinet minister ahead of the cabinet reshuffle in July 2021.He is currently the Chairperson of the Committee on Public Undertakings.

Early life
Born on 1 November 1948 in Bareilly, Santosh Kumar Gangwar attended Agra University and the Rohilkhand University in Uttar Pradesh, from where he completed his B. Sc. and LLB Degrees respectively.

He studied in Bareilly College, Bareilly only but during his B.Sc. it was affiliated to Agra University and during LLB Rohilkhand University was founded and the college was naturally affiliated with the same.

Bareilly College, Bareilly is a very old institution which was affiliated to Calcutta University, Allahabad University, Agra University and now Rohilkhand University, Bareilly.

Before joining politics, Gangwar was actively involved in the establishment of the Urban Cooperative Bank in Bareilly and held the position of its chairman since its beginning in the year 1996. In Bareilly, he has been given credit for getting several projects executed for public use such as Chaupla Railway over-bridge, a library, and a mini bypass.  Married to Saubhagya Gangwar, he is blessed with two children, Apoorv Gangwar and Shruti Gangwar.
 He suffers from vitiligo.

Career
Gangwar was jailed during the Emergency for guiding a people's movement against the then Government. He served as a member of the Uttar Pradesh State BJP Working Committee and held the position of General Secretary of the Uttar Pradesh BJP Unit in 1996.

Gangwar was elected for the first time to the 9th Lok Sabha in 1989 from the Bareilly constituency. He represented that constituency continuously until 2009 as a BJP Member of Parliament, which involved six successive terms.

He has held ministerial posts in the Government of India. He was Minister of State for Petroleum and Natural Gas with the additional charge of Parliament Affairs in 13th Lok Sabha. Prior to this, Gangwar was Minister of State of Science and Technology with the additional charge of Parliamentary Affairs during October and November 1999.

Santosh Gangwar is a Member of Parliament in the 16th Lok Sabha.

He served as Minister of State for Textiles from 26 May 2014 to 5 July 2016, after which he was sworn in as Minister of State for Finance.

Gangwar forayed into national politics in the year 1989, when he got elected from Bareilly in the 9th Lok Sabha on a BJP ticket. In 1996, Gangwar became the General Secretary of the BJP's Uttar Pradesh unit. Later, he kept on winning from the same constituency and remained an MP in the next six successive terms till 2009.  In the 14th Lok Sabha, he was the chief whip of his party, but in the year 2009 elections for 15th Lok Sabha, he had to face defeat by a narrow margin.

In April 2018 Gangwar stirred controversy by saying that "one should not make a big deal" about rape in a country as large as India. The statements followed two incidents where BJP leaders were implicated in violent sexual assault of minors.

27 May 2014 onwards Union Minister of State (Independent Charge) Ministry of Textiles; Ministry of Parliamentary Affairs; and Ministry of Water Resources, River Development and Ganga Rejuvenation

In May 2019, Gangwar became the Minister of State (Independent Charge) for Labour and Employment.

References

|-

|-

|-

|-

External links
 Official biography from Parliament of India records
 Official Website

1948 births
Living people
Bharatiya Janata Party politicians from Uttar Pradesh
Politicians from Bareilly
India MPs 1989–1991
India MPs 1991–1996
India MPs 1996–1997
India MPs 1998–1999
India MPs 1999–2004
India MPs 2004–2009
India MPs 2014–2019
India MPs 2019–present
Lok Sabha members from Uttar Pradesh
Union ministers of state of India with independent charge
Narendra Modi ministry
Dr. Bhimrao Ambedkar University alumni
People with vitiligo